Harry 'Doc' Kloor is an American scientist, film producer, director, writer, and entrepreneur. Kloor was the first to be awarded two PhDs simultaneously in two distinct academic disciplines (i.e. Physics and Chemistry) both earned at Purdue University. In recognition of this achievement, he was named ABC person of the week in August 1994.

Scientific activities
Kloor is the CEO of Beyond Imagination and Jupiter 9 Productions, as well as the CSO of StemCC. He was one of the three co-founders of the Rocket Racing League, was one of the five original founding team members of Ansari XPRIZE, and served on the founding team for Singularity University, where he still serves as a media adviser. Kloor taught at the first summer session of Singularity University in 2009. He was also the chief science adviser for the X Prize Organization, advising X Prize Chairman and CEO Dr. Peter H. Diamandis on science and technology issues. In 2011, Kloor was one of the chairs of the  DARPA's 100 Year Starship study.

Kloor also co-founded the company Universal Consultants, where he served as chief science consultant, providing guidance to clients in the development of new technological products, patents, and policy positions. These clients include NASA, the National Security Agency, the American Institute of Chemical Engineers, the US Senate, American Medical Association, and Jet Propulsion Laboratories.

Film

Kloor is a film writer, director, and producer. He has written for Star Trek: Voyager and was the story editor for Gene Roddenberry's Earth: Final Conflict, a series he co-created/developed. Kloor has received Federal grants to develop some of his work with the entertainment industry, creating TV/film projects with NASA and the U.S. Immigration Customs Enforcement Agency. He completed his first feature in 2010, co-directing,  producing and writing  Quantum Quest: A Cassini Space Odyssey, a 3-D, computer-animated, action adventure, sci-fi program. In 2014, he co-wrote and produced a film titled ILL WIND, based on Kevin J. Anderson's and Doug Beason's book.

Filmography
As producer
 Earth: Final Conflict (20 episodes, 1997–1998)
 Quantum Quest: A Cassini Space Odyssey (2010) (and as director and writer)
 ILL WIND (2015-2017) (and as  writer)
As writer
 Earth: Final Conflict (1 episode 1997, 15 stories uncredited)
Episode "Scorpion's Dream" (1997)
 Star Trek: Voyager (6 episodes, 1997–1998)
 "Real Life" (1997)
 "The Raven" (1997)
 "Scientific Method" (1997)
 "Be Afraid of the Dark" (unproduced, 1999)
 "Drone" (1998)
 "False Profits" (1998)
 Godzilla: The Series (1 episode, 1999)
 "Competition" (1999)
 Deadzone: The Series (1 episode, 2004)
 "The Master" (unproduced, 2004)
 Quantum Quest: A Cassini Space Odyssey (2010)
 ILL WIND (2015)
 Carson of Venus (2016)

References

External links

DonnaReed.co
Harry Kloor interview
SignaCert
Southern Oregon University alumni files

Living people
1963 births
American film producers
American television producers
American film directors
21st-century American physicists
21st-century American chemists
Purdue University alumni
English-language film directors
American film studio executives
Southern Oregon University alumni
American male screenwriters
American chief technology officers
American chief executives
21st-century American screenwriters